Avilov is a rural locality (a khutor) and the administrative center of Avilovskoye Rural Settlement, Ilovlinsky District, Volgograd Oblast, Russia. The population was 724 as of 2010. There are 15 streets.

Geography 
Avilov is located in steppe, on the Volga Upland, 12 km northeast of Ilovlya (the district's administrative centre) by road. Borovki is the nearest rural locality.

References 

Rural localities in Ilovlinsky District